Dikeledi Phillistus Magadzi is a South African African National Congress politician who served as a Member of the National Assembly from 2014 until 2023. She served as Chairperson of the Portfolio Committee on Transport from 2014 to 2019, as Deputy Minister of Transport from 2019 to 2021 and as Deputy Minister of Water and Sanitation from 2021 until 2023. Magadzi had previously served as a Member of the Executive Council (MEC) in the Limpopo Provincial Government.

Biography
Magadzi is a member of the African National Congress. From 1994 to 1998, she served as the Member of the Executive Council (MEC)  responsible for the 
Public Works portfolio in the Limpopo Provincial Government. She then served as the MEC for Agriculture from 2004 to 2009 and as the MEC for Safety and Security from 2009 to 2010. Magadzi was a member of the Federation of South African Women, a member of the National Executive Committee of the African National Congress Women's League from 1990 to 1996, National Education, Health and Allied Workers' Union (NEHAWU) from 1987 to 1994 and the United Democratic Front (UDF) from 1985 to 1990. From 2007 to 2022, she served on the National Executive Committee of the African National Congress. Magadzi has five children and two grandchildren.

In 2014, Magadzi was elected to the National Assembly as one of 249 ANC MPs. She was elected to chair the Portfolio Committee on Transport (2014-2019).

Following her re-election in 2019, she was appointed as the Deputy Minister of Transport. In August 2021, Magadzi was appointed Deputy Minister of Water and Sanitation.

Magadzi unsuccessfully stood for re-election to the NEC at the ANC's 55th National Conference in December 2022. She was removed as Deputy Minister and replaced with Judith Tshabalala in a cabinet reshuffle on 6 March 2023. By 15 March 2023, Magadzi had resigned as a Member of Parliament.

References

External links

Profile at Parliament of South Africa

Living people
Year of birth missing (living people)
Place of birth missing (living people)
People from Limpopo
African National Congress politicians
Members of the National Assembly of South Africa
Women members of the National Assembly of South Africa
Members of the Limpopo Provincial Legislature
Women members of provincial legislatures of South Africa